The Counties of Kenya are geographical units created by the 2010 Constitution of Kenya as the new units of devolved government. They replaced the previous provincial system. The establishment and executive powers of the counties is provided in Chapter Eleven of the Constitution on devolved government, the Constitution's Fourth Schedule and any other legislation passed by the Senate of Kenya concerning counties. The counties are also single-member constituencies which elect members of the Senate, and special woman members to the National Assembly. 

As of 2022, there are 47 counties whose size and boundaries are based on 1992 districts. Following the re-organization of Kenya's national administration, counties were integrated into a new national administration with the national government posting a county commissioner to each county to serve as a collaborative link with county government.

Establishment
County governments were established in all 47 counties after the general elections in March 2013. The counties' names are set out in the First Schedule of the Constitution.

List of counties
Under the new constitution, Kenya is now divided into 47 counties for administrative purposes. They are grouped below according to the former province they were separated from, with their areas and populations as of the 2009 and the 2019 census:

County governments
County governments are responsible for county legislation (outlined in article 185 of the Constitution of Kenya), executive functions (outlined in article 183), functions outlined in the fourth schedule of the constitution of Kenya, functions transferred from the national government through article 187 of the constitution of Kenya, functions agreed upon with other counties under article 189(2) of the constitution of Kenya, and establishment and staffing of a public service (under article 235 of the Constitution of Kenya). The functions of governments assigned to counties by the fourth schedule of the Constitution of Kenya are:

Agriculture
 Crop and animal husbandry
 Livestock sale yards
 County abattoirs (slaughterhouses)
 Plant and animal disease control
 Fisheries

County health services
 County health facilities and pharmacies
 Ambulance services
 Promotion of primary health care
 Licensing and control of undertakings that sell food to the public
 Veterinary services (excluding regulation of the profession)
 Cemeteries, funeral parlors and crematoria
 Refuse removal, refuse dumps and solid waste disposal.
Food distribution and Free services for pregnant mothers

Pollution, nuisances and advertising control
Control of air pollution, noise pollution, other public nuisances and outdoor advertising

Cultural activities, public entertainment and public amenities
 Betting, casinos and other forms of gambling
 Racing
 Liquor licensing
 Cinemas
 Video shows and hiring
 Libraries
 Museums
 Sports and cultural activities and facilities
 County parks, beaches and recreation facilities
 Ice skating
 Sport fishing
 Golf
 Horse racing
 Rugby

County transport
 County roads
 Street lighting
 Traffic and parking
 Public road transport
 Ferries and harbors, excluding the regulation of international and national shipping and matters related thereto
 SGR- Madaraka Express (modern railway experience)

Trade development and regulation
 Markets
 Trade licenses, excluding regulation of professions
 Fair trading practices
 Local tourism
 Cooperative societies

County planning and development
 Statistics
 Land surveying, planning and mapping of resources 
 Boundaries and fencing
 Housing
 Electricity and gas reticulation and energy regulation

Education and childcare
 Pre-primary education, village polytechnics, homecraft center's and childcare facilities
 Adult education and national exam registration for the same.

Policy implementation
 Implementation of specific national government policies on natural resources and environmental conservation
 Soil and water conservation
 Forestry

County public works and services
 Stormwater management systems in built-up areas
 Water and sanitation services

Fire fighting services and disaster management

Counties are mandated by the 2010 constitution of Kenya to enact legislation and laws that ensures management and controls of fire fighting.

Control of drugs and pornography

Coordination
 Ensuring and coordinating the participation of communities and locations in governance at the local level
 Assisting communities and locations to develop the administrative capacity for the effective exercise of the functions and powers and participation in governance at the local level

County executive committee
The county governor and the deputy county governor are the chief executive and deputy chief executive of the county, respectively.
The Independent Electoral and Boundaries Commission shall not conduct a separate election for the deputy governor but shall declare the running mate of the person who is elected county governor to have been elected as the deputy governor.
Each county will be run by an executive committee, consisting of:
A governor, elected directly by the people
A deputy, elected as running mate of the successful candidate for governorship
A number of committee members not exceeding a third (or ten where a county assembly has more than 30 members) of the members of the respective county assembly 
A county secretary, nominated by the governor and approved by the county assembly, who will double up as head of the county public service, and secretary to the county executive committee
Uniquely among democracies, Kenyan law requires governors to have a recognised university degree.

County assemblies
The counties each have an assembly whose members are elected from single-member constituencies known as wards. There may also be a number of nominated members as is necessary to ensure that neither male nor female members constitute more than two-thirds of the assembly. There will also be six nominated members to represent marginalised groups (persons with disabilities, and the youth) and a county assembly speaker who will be an ex officio member of the assembly.

See also
List of counties of Kenya by GDP
Provinces of Kenya
Kenyan general election, 2013
ISO 3166-2:KE

References

External links

Kenya county websites
OpenData Tharaka-Nithi

 
Counties, Kenya
Politics of Kenya
Subdivisions of Kenya
Kenya